Cressey (formerly, Cressy) is a census-designated place in Merced County, California. The population was 366 at the 2020 United States census, down from 393 in 2010.

Cressey is located in the northern part of Merced County. It is just east of where the Santa Fe railroad (original line of the San Francisco and San Joaquin Valley Railroad) crosses the Merced River. Ballico is across the river to the northwest. Livingston is to the southwest, and Winton is southeast of Cressey. The ZIP Code is 95312. The area is inside area code 209.

History
The Cressy post office opened in 1882, closed in 1883, re-opened in 1909, and changed its name to Cressey in 1912. The town was named by the Atchison, Topeka and Santa Fe Railway for Calvin J. Cressey, local landowner.
Cressey has one Postal Office, located on Cressey Way. The Old Post Office was located behind the Cressey General Store, on Third St. 
Cressey has one active General Store, located on the corner of Santa Fe Dr. and Third St. In the past, the Cressey Store had two Gasoline Pumps; then was reduced to one. Then after, all were taken out of service and removed.
Cressey has one county-owned Park, located on Cressey Way, just west of the Ward Canal, but it's said to be maintained by a few citizens and the Cal-Fire Firefighter Volunteers.
Cressey was also said to have one church (but later turned into a private home) on the corner of Crocker Ave and Third St. It was also said that Cressey had a Hotel near the RailRoad (Santa Fe) but has not been confirmed.
Cressey had an Old "one-lane" iron suspension bridge (similar to the Historic Shaffer Bridge), that was off of Meadow Dr, that went over the Merced River. That bridge was a "cut-off" or an alternate way to Ballico, CA; that went onto Alves Rd. The bridge was later demolished after multiple injuries sustained by kids jumping off into the water.
Cressey is patrolled by the Merced County Sheriffs Office.
Cressey has one Elementary School (Ballico-Cressey School District, K-2).

Geography
According to the United States Census Bureau, the CDP covers an area of 1.8 square miles (4.6 km), all of it land.
To the North of Cressey, beyond the Merced River, it is considered Ballico, Ca.
To the South of Cressey, Palm Ave and Beyond,  it is considered Winton, Ca.
To the West of Cressey, over the Santa Fe Rail Road and beyond, it is considered Livingston, Ca.
To the East of Cressey, off of Cressey Way onto Meadow Dr and beyond, it is considered Winton, Ca as well.

Demographics

The 2010 United States Census reported that Cressey had a population of 394. The racial makeup of Cressey was 253 (64.2%) White, 1 (0.3%) African American, 3 (0.8%) Native American, 15 (3.8%) Asian, 1 (0.3%) Pacific Islander, 95 (24.1%) from other races, and 26 (6.6%) from two or more races. Hispanic or Latino of any race were 195 persons (49.5%).

The Census reported that 394 people (100% of the population) lived in households, 0 (0%) lived in non-institutionalized group quarters, and 0 (0%) were institutionalized.

There were 114 households, out of which 50 (43.9%) had children under the age of 18 living in them, 72 (63.2%) were opposite-sex married couples living together, 11 (9.6%) had a female householder with no husband present, 7 (6.1%) had a male householder with no wife present.  There were 4 (3.5%) unmarried opposite-sex partnerships, and 4 (3.5%) same-sex married couples or partnerships. 18 households (15.8%) were made up of individuals, and 9 (7.9%) had someone living alone who was 65 years of age or older. The average household size was 3.46.  There were 90 families (78.9% of all households); the average family size was 3.90.

The population was spread out, with 109 people (27.7%) under the age of 18, 44 people (11.2%) aged 18 to 24, 90 people (22.8%) aged 25 to 44, 95 people (24.1%) aged 45 to 64, and 56 people (14.2%) who were 65 years of age or older.  The median age was 35.8 years. For every 100 females, there were 98.0 males.  For every 100 females age 18 and over, there were 96.6 males.

The homeowner vacancy rate was 0%; the rental vacancy rate was 10.3%.  303 people (76.9% of the population) lived in owner-occupied housing units and 91 people (23.1%) lived in rental housing units.

Government

Local
The Merced Irrigation District provides irrigation water. Ballico and Cressey share an elementary school district. Most Cressey students continue on to Livingston High School in the Merced Union High School District. Fire protection is provided by Cal Fire under contract to Merced County Fire Department. Station 64 is staffed with one career fire officer each shift, and local volunteers.
Merced County Sheriffs Department is the Patrol for this unincorporated area.

State and federal

References

Census-designated places in Merced County, California
Census-designated places in California

es:Creston (California)